Bosko's Knight-Mare is a 1933 Looney Tunes animated short film featuring Bosko, the first star of the series. The film was directed by Hugh Harman. The film score was composed by Frank Marsales.

Summary

Bosko falls asleep while reading about medieval chivalry, and dreams that he's one of King Arthur's Knights of the Round Table, along with other film comedians. The villainous Black Knight kidnaps Honey, and Bosko rides to the rescue. The dream ends as Bosko chops up a suit of armor, then jumps back into bed.

References

External links
 

1933 films
1933 animated films
American black-and-white films
Films about dreams
Films about kidnapping
Films scored by Frank Marsales
Films directed by Hugh Harman
Bosko films
Looney Tunes shorts
Warner Bros. Cartoons animated short films
Films produced by Leon Schlesinger
1930s Warner Bros. animated short films